Julie Ertel (born Julie Swail on December 27, 1972) is an American water polo player who was the team captain of the US Women's National Team that captured the silver medal at the 2000 Summer Olympics.

She competed in the triathlon at the 2008 Summer Olympics taking 19th place crossing the finish line in a time of 2:02:39.22, 4:11.56 behind the gold medalist.  Swail is a graduate of the University of California, San Diego, and received an M.Ed. in Physical Education from Azusa Pacific University.

Ertel currently serves on the advisory board for MODe Sports Nutrition.

See also
 List of Olympic medalists in water polo (women)

References

External links
 
 Water polo roster 2000
 Triathlon profile

1972 births
Living people
American female water polo players
Azusa Pacific University alumni
Water polo players at the 2000 Summer Olympics
American female triathletes
Triathletes at the 2003 Pan American Games
Triathletes at the 2007 Pan American Games
Triathletes at the 2008 Summer Olympics
Olympic triathletes of the United States
UC San Diego Tritons women's water polo players
Olympic silver medalists for the United States in water polo
Medalists at the 2000 Summer Olympics
Pan American Games gold medalists for the United States
Pan American Games medalists in triathlon
Medalists at the 2007 Pan American Games
Sportspeople from Anaheim, California